Repišče (in older sources Repiče) is a settlement in the Haloze Hills in the Municipality of Videm in eastern Slovenia. The area traditionally belonged to the Styria region. It is now included in the Drava Statistical Region.

Two small chapel-shrines in the settlement, one close to house no. 9 and the other next to house no. 25, were built in 1863 and 1909, respectively.

References

External links
Repišče on Geopedia

Populated places in the Municipality of Videm